This is a list of male professional bodybuilders.

A

 Fouad Abiad
 Manohar Aich, "Pocket Hercules"
 Abdulhadi Al-Khayat
 Achim Albrecht
 Troy Alves
 Charles Atlas
 Art Atwood
 Dayo Audi

B

 Jim Badra
 William Bankier
 Mohammad Bannout
 Samir Bannout
 Gustavo Badell
 Clarence_Bass
 Mohammed Benaziza
 Francisco 'Paco' Bautista
 Albert Beckles
 Bob Birdsong
 Troy Brown
 Jeremy Buendia
 Chris Bumstead, "CBum"

C
 Evan Centopani
 Marcos Chacon
 Darrem Charles
 Hadi Choopan
 Sangram Chougule
 Bob Cicherillo
 Ronnie Coleman "The GOAT"
 Franco Columbu
 Chris Cook
 Chris Cormier
 Ed Corney
 Porter Cottrell
 Brandon Curry
 Jay Cutler

D
 Gaétan D'Amours
 Roland Dantes, "Mr. Philippines", Martial Arts instructor, Arnis master
 Paul Demayo, "Quadzilla"
 Nathan DeTracy
 Chris Dickerson
 Paul Dillett
 Premchand Dogra
 Dave Draper
 Mark Dugdale
 Carlos G. Duque

E

 Mboya Edwards
 Stan Efferding
 George Eiferman
 Nasser El Sonbaty
 Mamdouh Elssbiay, "Big Ramy"
 Ahmet Enünlü

F
 Erik Fankhouser
 Lou Ferrigno, actor and fitness trainer best known for the title role in The Incredible Hulk television series 
 Bertil Fox
 Felipe Franco
 Toney Freeman
 Alexandr Fedorov

G
 Rich Gaspari
 Nazar Ghazali
 Varinder Singh Ghuman
 Anders Graneheim
 Kai Greene
 John Grimek
 Guy Grundy

H
 Ahmad Haidar
 Marcus Haley
 Lee Haney
 Mark Harris
 Mickey Hargitay
 Phil Heath, "The Gift", seven-time Mr. Olympia
 David Henry
 Roy Hilligenn

I

J

 Dexter Jackson
 Johnnie O. Jackson
 Dennis James
 Rusty Jeffers
 Michael Johnson

K
 Shahriar Kamali, "King Kamali"
 Mike Katz
 Edward Kawak
 Michael Kefalianos
 Suhas Khamkar, nine-time Mr. India, Mr. Asia 2010
 Kim Kold, "Winner at Danish Bodybuilding Championship in 2006"
 Greg Kovacs
 Steve Kuclo

L
 Lee Labrada
 Jack LaLanne
 Kevin Levrone "Maryland Muscle Machine"
 James "Flex" Lewis
 Aaron Links
 Anibal Lopez
 Dan Lurie, AAU Mr. America "America's Most Muscular Man" 1942-1946

M
 Víctor Martínez, "Dominican Dominator"
 Mike Matarazzo
 Earl Maynard
 Frank McGrath, "Bryn"
 Tim McGuire
 Stan McQuay
 Mike Mentzer, "Mister Heavy Duty"
 Ray Mentzer, brother of Mike Mentzer
 Mustafa Mohammad
 Andreas Münzer

N
 Kodi Rammurthy Naidu
 Jamo Nezzar
 Konstantin Nerchenko
 Serge Nubret
 Tony Nicholson

O
 Sergei Ogorodnikov
 Mike O'Hearn 
 Sergio Oliva, "The Myth", three-time Mr. Olympia

P

 Danny Padilla, "The Giant Killer"
 Ben Pakulski
 Bob Paris
 Reg Park
 David Paul (of the Barbarian Twins)
 Peter Paul (of the Barbarian Twins)
 Bill Pearl
 Tony Pearson
 Rich Piana
 Robert Piotrkowicz
 Tom Platz, "The Quadfather", "The Golden Eagle"
 Harold Poole
 Edson Prado
 Lee Priest
 Tom Prince
 Lucion Pushparaj, "Black Lion of Asia"
 Peter Putnam

R
 Ade Rai
 Shawn Ray
 Tito Raymond
 Steve Reeves
 Arthur Robin
 Robby Robinson, "The Black Prince"
 Ronny Rockel
 Clarence Ross
 Raymond Routledge
 Markus Rühl

S

 Feras Saied
 Frank Saldo
 Monte Saldo
 Silvio Samuel
 Eugen Sandow, "father" of modern bodybuilding
 Miloš Šarčev
 Marko Savolainen, "Supermass"
 Günter Schlierkamp, "The Gentle Giant"
 Sonny Schmidt, "Samoan", Masters Olympia Champion 1995
 Armin Scholz
 Arnold Schwarzenegger, "The Austrian Oak", Mr. Universe 1968, seven-time Mr. Olympia, actor, politician
 Larry Scott, "The Legend", two-time Mr. Universe, two-time Mr. Olympia
 Vic Seipke
 Sergey Shelestov
 Radosław Słodkiewicz
 Gary Strydom
 Joel Stubbs

T
 Vince Taylor
 Craig Titus
 Ramesses Tlyakodugov
 Al Treloar, winner of the first international bodybuilding contest in the United States, 1904

V
 Casey Viator
 Wesley Vissers
 Mikhail Volinkin

W

 Ken Waller
 Branch Warren, "Quadrasaurus Pecs"
 Ken "Flex" Wheeler, "Sultan of Symmetry"
 Jusup Wilkosz
 Bill Wilmore
 Scott Wilson
 Dennis Wolf

Y
 Hidetada Yamagishi, "The Dragon"
 Dorian Yates, "The Shadow", six-time Mr. Olympia

Z
 Frank Zane, "The Chemist", three-time Mr. Olympia

References

Bodybuilding
Male
Professional bodybuilding

Incomplete sports lists